Reginald George Pridmore  (29 April 1886 – 13 March 1918) was a field hockey player, who won the gold medal with the England team at the 1908 Summer Olympics in London. Pridmore set an Olympic record for most goals scored by an individual in an Olympic final in Men's field hockey with his 4 goals in England's 8–1 victory. This record stood till the 1952 Helsinki Olympics, where India's Balbir Singh Sr. scored 5 goals in India's 6–1 victory over the Netherlands.

Pridmore was also a cricketer, and played first-class cricket as a right-hand batsman for Warwickshire.

Pridmore was killed in action, aged 31, during the First World War, serving as a major with the Royal Field Artillery near the Piave River in Italy. He was buried at the Giavera British Cemetery nearby.

See also
 List of Olympians killed in World War I

References

External links
 

1886 births
English male field hockey players
English cricketers
English Olympic medallists
Warwickshire cricketers
Olympic field hockey players of Great Britain
British male field hockey players
Field hockey players at the 1908 Summer Olympics
1918 deaths
Olympic gold medallists for Great Britain
Royal Field Artillery officers
British military personnel killed in World War I
People from Edgbaston
Olympic medalists in field hockey
Medalists at the 1908 Summer Olympics
Hertfordshire cricketers
Royal Horse Artillery officers
British Army personnel of World War I